Tuxbury Pond is a lake which straddles the Massachusetts-New Hampshire border, abutting the towns of Amesbury, Massachusetts and South Hampton, New Hampshire.  It is located along the Powwow River.  It has two islands in the middle, and a large summer camp resort lies along the Massachusetts shore.

Lakes of Essex County, Massachusetts
Lakes of Rockingham County, New Hampshire
Amesbury, Massachusetts
Reservoirs in Massachusetts
Reservoirs in New Hampshire